Tom Funchess (born September 12, 1944) is a former American football offensive tackle in the National Football League. He was drafted by the Boston Patriots in the second round of the 1968 NFL Draft. He played college football at Jackson State.  Funchess also played for the Houston Oilers and Miami Dolphins.

References

External links
 New England Patriots profile

1944 births
Living people
American football offensive tackles
Boston Patriots players
Houston Oilers players
Jackson State Tigers football players
Miami Dolphins players
People from Crystal Springs, Mississippi
Players of American football from Mississippi
American Football League players